František Kovář (2 September 1888, in Sebranice – 12 June 1969, in Prague) was the third patriarch of the Czechoslovak Hussite Church.

Hr was formerly a Czech Roman Catholic reformist priest, later a theologian, journalist, translator, editor, spiritual leader of the Czechoslovak Hussite Church.

František Kovář (Doctor of Theology, PhD) was Dean of Hus's Czechoslovak Evangelical Faculty of Theology at Charles University in Prague.

After death of Patriarch Gustav Adolf Procházka in 1942, the position remained vacant until 1946 when František Kovář was elected third bishop-patriarch of the Czechoslovak (Hussite) Church ruling from 1946 to 1961 setting down when he was 73 and Miroslav Novák succeeded him as patriarch. Kovář died in 1969.

1888 births
1969 deaths
People from Blansko District
People from the Margraviate of Moravia
20th-century Czech Roman Catholic priests
Czechoslovak Hussite Church bishops
20th-century archbishops
Czechoslovak Roman Catholic priests
Former Roman Catholics
Academic staff of Charles University